Kopsia profunda is a species of plant in the family Apocynaceae. It is endemic to Peninsular Malaysia.

References

profunda
Endemic flora of Peninsular Malaysia
Data deficient plants
Taxonomy articles created by Polbot